Dung Williams (born ) is a Nigerian male weightlifter, competing in the +105 kg category and representing Nigeria at international competitions. He participated at the 2014 Commonwealth Games in the +105 kg event.

Major competitions

References

1990 births
Living people
Nigerian male weightlifters
Place of birth missing (living people)
Weightlifters at the 2014 Commonwealth Games
Commonwealth Games competitors for Nigeria
21st-century Nigerian people